A photography game is a form of video game in which taking photographs using the in-game camera system is a key game mechanic. Photography games often employ mechanics similar to a first-person shooter, but rather than using a gun to kill enemies, the aim is to use a camera to take photographs of the game world. Depending on the game, the act might incapacitate or defeat enemies, or the player might receive points or experience according to the composition of the photograph.

Photography elements can be the only significant mode of gameplay, as in Pokémon Snap or Afrika, or they can be used in combination with other gameplay modes such as action-adventure in Beyond Good & Evil or survival horror in Fatal Frame and Dead Rising.

History
An early photography game was Gekibo: Gekisha Boy, released in 1992 for the PC Engine. This was a side-scrolling video game where the player controlled a reticle representing a camera viewfinder moving over the screen. Another early photography game was the 1995 full-motion video game Paparazzi!: Tales of Tinseltown, although the limitations of the FMV format meant players had little control over what they photographed.

The 1999 game Pokémon Snap for the Nintendo 64 – a photography game in the Pokémon universe using rail shooter mechanics – sold well and was critically acclaimed. It inspired other safari and scuba diving photography games such as Endless Ocean (2007), Afrika (2008), Beyond Blue (2020) and a sequel New Pokémon Snap (2021).

In survival horror, the Fatal Frame series (also known as Project Zero) debuted in 2001 and turned photography into an attacking move. Players are tasked with photographing aggressive ghosts, with well focused and composed shots doing more damage. The series has six instalments including one augmented reality game, Spirit Camera, that uses the real camera on the Nintendo 3DS. Phasmophobia and the Outlast series are other survival horror games that give players cameras but no weapons – the aim is to record the monsters and escape without being killed.

Several games with photojournalist protagonists implemented photography sidequests. These include Beyond Good & Evil (2003), Dead Rising (2006) and Spider-Man 3 (2007). The Touhou Project series games Shoot the Bullet, Double Spoiler and Violet Detector used photojournalist protagonists to combine photography and bullet hell mechanics, with points awarded for the number of bullets in a photo.

Some experimental indie games have used photography mechanics to change the level itself – photographs taken in one part of the level can be pasted elsewhere in order to create new paths and objects. Such games include the 2D Snapshot and the 3D Viewfinder (formerly Polaroid Effect).

The genre saw a resurgence in the 2020s with the release of mostly independent games such as Sludge Life, Eastshade (which applies photography game mechanics to landscape painting), Shutter Stroll, Umurangi Generation, Nuts and Season. These fuse photography mechanics with the walking simulator genre to produce slow-paced games, often with environmental themes, as a response to the fast-paced and violent nature of shooter games.

Bonus features
Many games include a screenshot feature which has no effect on gameplay but allows players to capture moments. Photography mechanics are sometimes included for titillation separate from the main gameplay. The Dead or Alive Xtreme series and Metal Gear Solid 4: Guns of the Patriots for instance both include the ability to photograph female characters in skimpy clothing and erotic poses.

In some cases, photography games have included the ability to print images taken in-game. Pictures from Pokémon Snap could be copied from the cartridge and printed at branches of Blockbuster Video, while players of Firewatch could have the photographs on their in-game camera "developed" and delivered to their home.

See also
 Virtual photography, screenshots of video games as an art form
 Purikura, a genre of arcade games involving photography

References

Video game genres
Video game terminology